Bangkok Free Trade Zone (BFTZ) is an industrial park located near Bangkok, Thailand.

In 2013, Ticon Logistics Park agreed to purchase  acres in the BFTZ where it planned to build  of warehouses. The company chose the area because it "is close to Bangkok and situated in the vicinity of major roads with transportation linkages that facilitate efficient logistics management between Bangkok and other provinces in all regions."

As of 2008, the Thai motorcycle manufacturer Toyotron produced its Hunter electric motorcycles in the BFTZ.

References

Industrial parks in Thailand